Craviotto may refer to
Saúl Craviotto (born 1984), Spanish sprint canoer 
Néstor Craviotto (born 1963), Argentinean football manager and former player
Craviotto drums, a drum kit manufacturing company based in Watsonville, California